Mitch Tambo is an Australian singer and songwriter who self-released his debut EP in 2016. In 2019, he reached the final of the ninth series of Australia's Got Talent and garnered national attention. In November 2019, Tambo was signed to Sony Music Australia.

Career
Tambo was born in Sydney and moved to Tamworth when he was 18 months old. Tambo says his mother Roz Parker empowered him to embrace his Aboriginal Australian (Gamilaraay) culture and identity, while his Aunty Bernadette Duncan helped him revive his language. Tambo said "My mum has been my greatest influencer, period. When it comes to culture, she empowered and encouraged me 1000 per cent to dive in and never look back. She's seen the power in it and what it's done for my spirit."

In 2010, Tambo travelled to Rome for the canonisation of Mary MacKillop. In 2013, Tambo hosted children's TV series Muso Magic Outback Tracks; a production which showcases and highlights positive stories in remote Aboriginal communities. 
In 2015, Tambo started True Culture; a program that empowers young people to explore their identity through cultural performance, mentor workshops, bush tucker and art experiences and to empower disengaged kids, those in foster care or on the brink of juvenile justice.

In 2016, Tambo self-released his debut extended play titled Guurrama-Li. It was re-released on Songbird Records in July 2018.

In 2019, Tambo auditioned for the ninth series of Australia's Got Talent, where he performed his single "Walanbaa". He progressed to the semi-final after receiving the golden buzzer from judge and former Pussycat Dolls lead singer Nicole Scherzinger, who was visibly moved by his audition, describing him as "a true representative of Australia's beauty, culture and talent". In the semi-final, he received another golden buzzer from judge Natalie Bassingthwaighte after performing a bilingual version of "You're the Voice" wearing the Dhinawan and Murray crest and feathers. He progressed to the final, where his placing was undisclosed.

Immediately following the Australia's Got Talent, his EP began charting on iTunes charts across the world and a fan Twitter campaign was launched to have Tambo represent Australia in the Eurovision Song Contest.

In November 2019, Tambo announced he had signed a record deal with Sony Music Australia. Tambo said "I'm so honoured to become part of the Sony Music Australia family. Denis Handlin is the country's most passionate supporter of local artists, so Sony is the perfect place for me to realise my dreams of bringing traditional and contemporary Aboriginal music to all Australians – and the world." On 19 November 2019, Tambo was announced as a participant in Eurovision - Australia Decides; in an attempt to represent Australia in the Eurovision Song Contest 2020 with the song "Together". In the Eurovision - Australia Decides final, "Together" placed 5th in a field of 10.

In December 2019, and after performing it in the semi-final of Australia's Got Talent, Tambo released the bilingual version of "You're the Voice" in English and Gamilaraay. He performed the song at the NITV sunrise ceremony for Australia Day on 26 January, and later with John Farnham as the finale of the Fire Fight Australia concert in February 2020.

On 15 May 2020, Tambo released "Love". In a statement, Tambo said "'Love' is a reminder to reach deep down within, heal and set our spirits free with love, healing and hope for a better tomorrow."

In September 2022, Tambo released "Come Together" with Lee Kernaghan and Isaiah Firebrace.

Personal life
Tambo is a Gamilaraay and Birri Gubba man and lives in Melbourne.

Tambo is expecting his first child with his wife Lele in November 2021.

Discography

Extended plays

Singles

Awards and nominations

Country Music Awards of Australia
The Country Music Awards of Australia is an annual awards night held in January during the Tamworth Country Music Festival. Celebrating recording excellence in the Australian country music industry. They commenced in 1973.
 

! 
|-
|rowspan="2"| 2023 ||rowspan="2"| "Come Together" (with Lee Kernaghan and Isaiah Firebrace) || Vocal Collaboration of the Year ||  ||rowspan="2"|  
|-
| Heritage Song of the Year || 
|-

NIMA
The National Indigenous Music Awards is an annual awards ceremony that recognises the achievements of Indigenous Australians in music. The award ceremony commenced in 2004.

|-
| 2020
| Mitch Tambo
| New Talent of the Year
|

References

External links 
 electricfmusic Twitter account
 mitchtambo Facebook account

Australian male singers
Australian songwriters
Indigenous Australian musicians
Gamilaraay
Living people
Year of birth missing (living people)
Australia's Got Talent contestants